Colin Hemingway (born August 12, 1980 in Regina, Saskatchewan) is a Canadian former professional ice hockey player who last played for the Wichita Thunder of the Central Hockey League. He played three games in the National Hockey League with the St. Louis Blues. Currently playing in the ASHL (Adult Safe Hockey League) where he has 522 pts in 240 games played. As a youth, he played in the 1994 Quebec International Pee-Wee Hockey Tournament with a minor ice hockey team from Surrey, British Columbia.

Awards and honours

References

External links

1980 births
Living people
Belfast Giants players
Canadian ice hockey centres
Ice hockey people from Saskatchewan
New Hampshire Wildcats men's ice hockey players
St. Louis Blues draft picks
St. Louis Blues players
Sportspeople from Regina, Saskatchewan
Wichita Thunder players
Edinburgh Capitals players
Canadian expatriate ice hockey players in Northern Ireland
Canadian expatriate ice hockey players in Scotland
AHCA Division I men's ice hockey All-Americans
Canadian expatriate ice hockey players in the United States
Canadian expatriate ice hockey players in Germany